Astrid Ydén (1881-1963) was a Swedish harpist.

References 

1881 births
1963 deaths